Pandolfo is the Italian form of the masculine given name Pandulf. It may refer to:

Given name
Pandolfo da Lucca (1101–1201), 12th-century Italian cardinal
Pandolfo I Malatesta (c. 1267–1326), Italian condottiero and Lord of Rimini
Pandolfo II Malatesta (1325–1373), Italian condottiero
Pandolfo III Malatesta (c. 1369–1427), Italian condottiero and lord of Fano
Pandolfo IV Malatesta (1475–1534), Italian condottiero and lord of Rimini
Pandolfo Petrucci (1452–1512), ruler of the Italian city of Siena during the Renaissance
Pandolfo Reschi (1643–1699), Italian painter
Pandolfo Savelli (died 1306), Italian statesman
Pandolfo da Polenta (died 1347), joint lord of Ravenna and Cervia
Sigismondo Pandolfo Malatesta (1417–1468), Italian condottiero

Surname
Jay Pandolfo (born 1974), American hockey player
Mike Pandolfo (born 1979),  American professional ice hockey left wing
Nina Pandolfo (born 1997), Brazilian street artist
Palo Pandolfo (1964–2021), Argentine singer, guitarist and producer
Paolo Pandolfo, Italian composer and teacher of music
Samuel Pandolfo (1874–1960)

See also
Pandolfo Malatesta (disambiguation)
 Gallucci